François Magatti (born 1 September 1889, date of death unknown) was a Swiss racing cyclist. He rode in the 1924 Tour de France.

References

1889 births
Year of death missing
Swiss male cyclists
Place of birth missing